Blair Blenman (23 November 1932 – October 1999) was a British weightlifter. He competed in the men's middleweight event at the 1960 Summer Olympics.

References

1932 births
1999 deaths
British male weightlifters
Olympic weightlifters of Great Britain
Weightlifters at the 1960 Summer Olympics
Sportspeople from Bridgetown
Commonwealth Games medallists in weightlifting
Commonwealth Games gold medallists for Barbados
Barbadian male weightlifters
Weightlifters at the 1958 British Empire and Commonwealth Games
Medallists at the 1958 British Empire and Commonwealth Games